The fifth series of the British children's television series The Dumping Ground began broadcasting on 20 January 2017 on CBBC and ended on 15 December 2017. The series follows the lives of the children living in the fictional children's care home of Ashdene Ridge, nicknamed by them "The Dumping Ground". It consists of twenty-two, thirty-minute episodes, airing in two halves in January–March and October–December 2017. It is the thirteenth series in The Story of Tracy Beaker franchise.

Cast

Main

Guest

Casting
18-year-old Connor Lawson, 19-year-old Emily Burnett, 9-year-old Jasmine Uson and 12-year-old Carma Hylton were cast as Alex, Charlie, Taz and Candi-Rose respectively.

Episodes

References

2017 British television seasons
The Dumping Ground